Navia robinsonii is a plant species in the genus Navia.This species is endemic to Venezuela.

References

robinsonii
Flora of Venezuela